Anophiodes meeki is a species of moth of the family Erebidae. It is found in Papua New Guinea.

References

Moths described in 1908
Anophiodes
Moths of Papua New Guinea